Eupogonius albipilis is a species of beetle in the family Cerambycidae. It was described by Stephan von Breuning in 1955. It is known from Trinidad.

References

Eupogonius
Beetles described in 1955